Dale Nulsen Van Vyven (April 20, 1925 – April 12, 2010) was a member of the Ohio House of Representatives from 1978 to 2000.  His district consisted of a portion of Hamilton County, Ohio.  He was succeeded by Wayne Coates.  Van Vyven died on April 12, 2010 at the age of 74 of a respiratory illness.

References

1925 births
Republican Party members of the Ohio House of Representatives
2010 deaths